Maragua District was a former district of Kenya, located in the defunct Central Province. Its capital was the town of Maragua. In 1999, Maragua District had a population of 387,969 and an area of 868 km2 . Maragua district was created in September 1996, when it was split from Muranga District.

In 2010, Maragua District was merged into Muranga County.

District subdivisions

Electoral constituencies
The district had three constituencies: 
Maragua Constituency
Kandara Constituency
Kigumo Constituency

External links 
Kenya National Mapping

 
Former districts of Kenya